Concerto Grosso in D Blues is an album by flautist Herbie Mann, merging jazz with classical music. It was recorded in 1968 and released on the Atlantic label.

Reception

AllMusic awarded the album 5 stars and its review by Richard Ginell states, "Not only is this rare LP one of Herbie Mann's own favorites, it is one of the most moving classical/jazz fusions ever recorded".

Track listing 
 "Concerto Grosso in D Blues" (Herbie Mann, William S. Fischer) - 28:12
 "Sense of No Return" (William S. Fischer) - 5:10
 "Wailing Wall" (Mann) - 9:42
 "My Little Ones" (Mann) - 7:08
Recorded at Teldec Studios in Berlin, West Germany on November 11, 1968 (track 1) and November 12, 1968 (tracks 2-4)

Personnel 
Herbie Mann - flute, arranger
Roy Ayers - vibraphone
Sonny Sharrock - guitar
Ron Carter - bass
Bruno Carr - drums
Symphonic Orchestra with concertmaster Hans Georg Arlt (track 1)
Brass Ensemble (track 2)
Double String Quartet (tracks 3 & 4)
William S. Fischer - arranger, conductor
Technical
Gerhard Neumann - recording
Joel Brodsky - photography

References 

Herbie Mann albums
1969 albums
Albums produced by Nesuhi Ertegun
Atlantic Records albums